Faras (formerly , Pakhôras; ; Old Nubian: Ⲡⲁⲭⲱⲣⲁⲥ, Pakhoras) was a major city in Lower Nubia. The site of the city, on the border between modern Egypt and Sudan at Wadi Halfa Salient, was flooded by Lake Nasser in the 1960s and is now permanently underwater. Before this flooding, extensive archaeological work was conducted by a Polish archaeological team led by professor Kazimierz Michałowski.

History

Dating back to the A-Group period, the town was a major centre during the Meroitic period, and was the site of a major temple. During the period of ancient Egyptian control over Nubia, Faras became an Egyptian administrative centre and, located upriver from Abu Simbel, Egyptian cultural influences were prominent.

The city reached its height during the Christian period of Nubia, when Faras was the capital of the basiliskos Silko of Nobadia. When Nobatia was absorbed into Makuria, it remained the most prominent center in the north, the seat of Nobadia's eparch.

Archaeology
In 1909–1912, research on the site was conducted by a British expedition from the University of Oxford headed by F.Ll. Griffith. Meroitic and Christian cemeteries, as well as Egyptian temples, were uncovered. At the turn of the 1960s, UNESCO organized the Nubian Salvage Campaign to preserve monuments from the area, which was to be flooded by Lake Nasser. Work in Faras, entrusted to Professor Kazimierz Michałowski, was carried out from 1960 to 1964 by the Polish Centre of Mediterranean Archaeology of the University of Warsaw in Cairo, which he had founded (now Polish Centre of Mediterranean Archaeology University of Warsaw). It turned out that the hill where the mission began excavations concealed a Christian cathedral with magnificent wall paintings. The researchers distinguished three main phases of its functioning. The cathedral was founded by bishop Aetios in 620 and then twice rebuilt: by Paulos at the beginning of the 8th century and Petros I at the end of the 10th century. The subsequent buildings were called after these bishops. The cathedral had been completely filled with sand thanks to which its structure and decoration were well preserved. These paintings are the best surviving examples of Christian Nubian art and depict portraits of archangels, mainly Michael, various monarchs and bishops of Faras, Christian saints, Virgin Mary and a number of Biblical scenes. They were executed in tempera on dry plaster, on several layers dated from the 8th to the 14th century. Of the 169 uncovered paintings, 120 were taken down from the walls. Sixty-six of them were transported to Poland and are today on display in the Polish National Museum in Warsaw, and in Sudan National Museum in Khartoum. In addition, a major pottery workshop was found.

Thanks to the discovery of the List of Bishops of Faras, it was possible to date each episcopate and thus to establish the date of some of the wall paintings.

In the turbulent later years of Christian Nubia, Faras seems to have declined and the administrative centre moved to the more easily defended area of Qasr Ibrim.

See also
Coptic Diocese of Faras
Faras Gallery at the National Museum in Warsaw

References

External links
Faras Gallery in the National Museum in Warsaw 
Faras - the salvage excavations
Polish excavations at Faras, video on YouTube
Description of exhibition on Faras, Vienna 2002
Medieval Nubia 

Nubian architecture in Sudan
Archaeological sites in Sudan
Former populated places in Sudan
Kushite cities